Robert Alfred Clarke (January 8, 1903 – January 1971), nicknamed "Eggie", was an American Negro league catcher and manager from the 1920s through the 1940s.

A native of Richmond, Virginia, Clarke made his Negro leagues debut in 1922 with the Richmond Giants. In 1923, he joined the Baltimore Black Sox, and played for the club through 1932. From 1933 to 1940, Clarke played for the New York Black Yankees, serving as player-manager in 1936 and 1937, and being selected to the East–West All-Star Game in 1940. He spent 1941 through 1946 with the Baltimore Elite Giants, and finished his career with a short return stint with the Black Yankees in 1948. Clarke died in Newark, New Jersey in 1971 at age 67 or 68.

References

External links
 and Baseball-Reference Black Baseball stats and Seamheads
 

1903 births
1971 deaths
Date of death missing
Baltimore Black Sox players
Baltimore Elite Giants players
Negro league baseball managers
New York Black Yankees players
20th-century African-American sportspeople
Baseball catchers